Denver Sundowns is a Eswatini soccer club based in Manzini. From 2005 to 2020, the team was known as Manzini Sundowns.

Achievements
Swazi Premier League: 2
 1989, 1990.

Swazi Cup: 3
 1988, 1991, 1992.

Swazi Charity Cup: 4
 1992, 2000, 2011, 2012.

Swazi Trade Fair Cup: 4
 1990, 1992, 1998, 2006.

Current squad

References 

Football clubs in Eswatini
1985 establishments in Swaziland
Manzini, Eswatini